Non-redemption is the term used by family fun centers and arcades to indicate that a particular game or attraction does not give out tickets for prizes, as opposed to a redemption game.

Redemption games are typically arcade games of skill that reward players proportionally to their score in the game. The reward most often comes in the form of tickets, with more tickets being awarded for higher scores. These tickets can then be redeemed (hence the name) at a central location for prizes. The most inexpensive prizes (candy, small plastic or rubber toys) may only require a small number of tickets to acquire, while the most expensive ones (skateboards, low end electronics) may require several thousand. In general, the amount of money spent to win enough tickets for a given prize will exceed the value of the prize itself.

Some redemption games, particularly electronic ones such as Flamin' Finger, involve elements of chance, which can be set by the operator.

A variation on the ticket-based redemption game is the merchandiser, which directly displays and dispenses merchandise, rather than dispensing tickets which are then redeemed for prizes.
Redemption games can be seen as the modern successor to carnival games, as the same general principles apply.

Game terminology